WCBK-FM (102.3 FM) is a radio station licensed to Martinsville, Indiana, United States.  The station is currently owned by Mid-America Radio Group, Inc. It has a country format.

References

External links

CBK-FM